The phrase Jesting Pilate can be:
a phrase coined by Francis Bacon in the opening sentence of his essay Of Truth
a name for the Biblical verse to which Bacon was referring, namely John 18:38
the title of a book by Aldous Huxley
the title of a book by Sir Owen Dixon